Sai Ketan Rao (born 10 July 1994), is an Indian actor. He is known for portraying the lead role of Raghav Rao in StarPlus's Mehndi Hai Rachne Waali.

Ketan's television debut began with Agni Sakshi. He also worked in one Hindi web series and a few Telugu web series. His web series include Three Half Bottles (2019) on ZEE5, Love Studio (2020) on YouTube, Lovely (2021) on ShreyasET, and Aham Bhramhasmi (2021) on MX Player and Hungama Digital. He also acted in Tollywood films such as Ajay Passayyadu (2019) and Strangers (2021) on Amazon Prime, and Mounam (2020) on Aha.

Early and personal life 
Sai Ketan Rao was born into a middle-class family in Lonavala Maharashtra. His father is an architect from Maharashtra, while his mother is a nutritionist from Hyderabad. He first started his schooling in Solapur, Maharashtra but soon shifted to Pune, Maharashtra and finally settled down in Hyderabad, Telangana. He completed his tenth grade in Hyderabad from Vignan School and pursued B. Tech in Computer Science from Hyderabad Institute of Technology and Management. After completing his graduation, he completed his MBA in System Operations from Gandhi Institute of Technology and Management, Hyderabad Campus.

Apart from acting, Ketan is a state-level boxer, and a swimmer.

Career 
Rao worked for an Australian company after concluding his education, but he had a strong inclination towards acting since childhood, and joined Ramanaidu Film School. He started his acting career after completing theatre arts and worked on short films and feature films. He has a film production company goes by the name Aurum Motion Pictures.

Filmography

Films

Short films

Television

Web series

Music videos

Awards and nominations

References

External links
 
 
 

1994 births
Living people
21st-century Indian male actors
Indian male film actors
Indian male television actors
Male actors in Telugu cinema
Male actors in Telugu television
Male actors in Hindi television